Knox Church is a Presbyterian church in Christchurch, New Zealand.

The original church was built in 1880 to a design by Samuel Farr. When the attendance increased beyond the capacity of the building, a new church was built in 1902 alongside the first one to a design by Robert England. Located on the corner of Bealey Avenue and Victoria Street, it was one of Christchurch's historic buildings that was badly damaged during the 2011 Christchurch earthquake, but which has been repaired to a design by Wilkie and Bruce Architects using the remaining wooden frame. Other buildings in the Knox complex remained functional.

References

Presbyterian churches in New Zealand
Religious buildings and structures in Christchurch
Christianity in Christchurch
Heritage New Zealand Category 2 historic places in Canterbury, New Zealand
2011 Christchurch earthquake
Listed churches in New Zealand